Jarosław Włodzimierz Gonciarz (born 28 August 1970 in Czeladź) – is a Polish politician, member of the VIII and IX Sejm from Law and Justice.

References 

1970 births
Living people
Law and Justice politicians